Gelatin is a translucent food ingredient. It may also refer to:

 Gelatin dessert
 Gelatine (airship)
 Gelatin (artist group)
Gelignite, also known as blasting gelatin

See also 

 Starch gelatinization